KVII-TV (channel 7) is a television station in Amarillo, Texas, United States, affiliated with ABC and The CW Plus. Owned by Sinclair Broadcast Group, the station maintains studios at One Broadcast Center between South Pierce and South Buchanan streets in downtown Amarillo, and its transmitter is located west of US 87/287, in unincorporated Potter County.

KVIH-TV (channel 12) in Clovis, New Mexico, operates as a full-time satellite of KVII-TV; this station's transmitter is located along State Road 88 (east of Portales). KVIH-TV covers areas of northeastern and east-central New Mexico that receive a marginal to non-existent over-the-air signal from KVII-TV, although there is significant overlap between the two stations' contours otherwise. KVIH-TV is a straight simulcast of KVII-TV; on-air references to KVIH-TV are limited to Federal Communications Commission (FCC)-mandated hourly station identifications during newscasts and other programming. Besides the transmitter, KVIH-TV does not maintain any physical presence in Clovis.

History
On September 20, 1956, Southwest States Inc. – a consortium managed by George Oliver, Robert Houck, Hoyt Houck, John McCarthy, Sam Fenberg and real estate firm Estate Development, and which owned radio station KAMQ (1010 AM, now KDJW) – filed an application with the Federal Communications Commission (FCC) to obtain a license and construction permit to operate a commercial television station on VHF channel 7. On February 5, 1957, Kenyon Brown – owner of local radio station KLYN (940 AM, now KIXZ) as well as KWFT in Wichita Falls (now Plano-licensed KTNO) – filed a separate license application for channel 7. Brown withdrew his application for VHF channel 7 on December 11 of that year, ceding the application to Southwest States under an agreement in which that group would pay Brown $10,000 for out-of-pocket expenses if application was granted by August 7, 1957, or $7,500 if application was granted by September 20. The FCC awarded the license and permit for channel 7 to Southern States on August 1, 1957; the group subsequently requested and received approval to assign KVII-TV (referencing the roman numeral for the number "7") as the television station's call letters.

Channel 7 first signed on the air on December 21, 1957, as the third television station to sign on in the Amarillo market, behind NBC affiliate KGNC-TV (channel 4, now KAMR-TV) and CBS affiliate KFDA-TV (channel 10), both of which signed on over four years earlier. KVII-TV has operated as an ABC affiliate since its debut, having assumed the local programming rights from KFDA-TV, which aired select network shows on a secondary basis since it signed on. The sign-of KVII made Amarillo one of the smallest markets in the U.S. to maintain full service from all three commercial broadcast television networks, although the market had no public television service until Amarillo College signed on KACV-TV (channel 2) in August 1988.

Only six months after it signed on, on June 28, 1958, Southwest States Inc. announced it would sell KVII-TV to Television Properties Inc. (owned by Jack C. Vaughn, Grady H. Vaughn Jr. and Cecil L. Trigg, respectively the co-owners and general manager of existing Television Properties outlet KOSA-TV in Odessa) for around $425,000, including obligations to own 77.7% of the station and an option to buy the remaining 22.5%. The sale received FCC approval almost one month later on July 16. In July 1961, the station relocated its studio facilities into the Walton Building (now the Maxor Building) on South Polk Street and Southwest Fourth Avenue in downtown Amarillo.

On August 1, 1963, Southwest States Inc. announced it would sell KVII to The Walton Group (founded by Kermit-based mineral rights entrepreneur John B. Walton Jr., and which also owned KVKM-AM-TV [now KCKM and KWES-TV, respectively] in Odessa, Texas and held a minority stake in KFNE-FM in Big Spring) for $1.25 million. The sale received FCC approval nearly 3½ months later on November 12. In October 1967, The Walton Group announced it would sell KVII-TV to Amarillo-based Marsh Media Ltd. (founded by Estelle Marsh, mother of Stanley Marsh 3, Tom F. Marsh, Michael C. Marsh and Estelle Marsh Wattlington, each of whom owned spare 5% interests not held by Estelle and managed local charity organization The Marsh Foundation) for $1.5 million. As part of the sale agreement, John Walton Jr. – who retained ownership of KVII-AM-FM – signed a ten-year non-compete contract to remain with KVII-TV as a station consultant for a salary of $50,000 per year. The sale received FCC approval on January 31, 1968.

Since 1968, when Marsh Media adopted the design shortly after purchasing the station, KVII-TV has used proprietary version of the Circle 7 logo initially designed by G. Dean Smith for ABC's six original owned-and-operated stations and later expanded to many ABC-affiliated stations that broadcast on channel 7. It is the longest-continuously used logo among the Amarillo market's television stations (commercial or non-commercial). The station also utilized variants of the "Circle 7" for KVIJ-TV starting in 1979 and for KVIH-TV starting in 1986 for use in required hourly station identifications for KVII and its satellites, with those variants utilizing thin block lettering for those station's respective channel 8 and channel 12 allocations. (The KVIH variant was discontinued in 2001.) The logo is also adorned atop the station's studio facilities at One Broadcast Center, a pyramid-shaped building on Southeast 11th Avenue and South Pierce Street in downtown Amarillo, into which KVII relocated its operations in 1968.

KVII-TV found it difficult to adequately compete against KGNC-TV and KFDA-TV largely because of the difficulties experienced by television stations operating in rugged terrain. The station was all but unviewable in Clovis, Portales and surrounding areas of northeastern New Mexico as well as portions of the far eastern Texas Panhandle. Many viewers in those areas received ABC programming either via KOAT-TV in Albuquerque or KOCO-TV in Oklahoma City. To solve this problem, KVII launched a network of UHF translators to serve areas not covered by its main signal. In October 1975, Marsh Media acquired KFDO-TV (channel 8) in Sayre, Oklahoma, from Bass Broadcasting Co. (then-owner of KFDA-TV) for $300,000; Marsh intended to convert KFDO – which Bass unloaded as part of its divestiture of its broadcast holdings to focus on its oil and gas exploration endeavors, and had been serving as a KFDA satellite since 1966 – into a satellite station of KVII to reach viewers in the eastern Texas Panhandle as well as those in west-central Oklahoma who could not adequately receive ABC programming from KOCO. In January 1976, Marsh changed the Sayre station's call letters to KVIJ-TV to match its new parent station. KVII was one of the first commercial stations to air the PBS program Sesame Street. It started in 1970 and continued to air it until KACV signed on.

Following the death of Bill McAlister in October 1985, Marsh acquired a former satellite of KFDA, KMCC (channel 12) in Clovis, New Mexico, from his company, McAlister Television Enterprises Inc., for $1.5 million. KMCC – which had been operating as a satellite of fellow ABC affiliate KAMC-TV in Lubbock since 1979 – converted into a KVII satellite in September 1986, under the call letters KVIH-TV, to relay its programming into portions of eastern New Mexico who could not adequately receive ABC programming from KOAT. On December 2, 1992, Marsh Media shut down KVIJ, citing the fact that very few television viewers in its west-central Oklahoma service area actually tuned into KVIJ directly, due to the ability of receiving ABC network programming via cable through either KOCO-TV out of Oklahoma City or KSWO-TV out of the Wichita Falls–Lawton DMAs. (KVIJ's former studio and transmitter site at the intersection of state highways 6 and 152, northwest of Sayre, currently sits vacant.)

On August 26, 2002, Marsh Media announced it would sell KVII-TV and KVIH-TV to Atlanta-based New Vision Group for $16.85 million. On April 7, 2005, New Vision Group announced it would sell KVII/KVIH to Schaumburg, Illinois-based Barrington Broadcasting (owned by New York City-based private equity firm Pilot Group LP and then headed by former National Association of Broadcasters joint board chairman and Benedek Broadcasting CEO Jim Yager) for $22.5 million.

On February 28, 2013, Barrington announced that it would sell KVII-TV, KVIH-TV and the company's sixteen other television stations (six of which were transferred to or remained under the ownership of third-party licensees to address ownership conflicts and had their operations handled by Sinclair through shared services agreements) to the Hunt Valley, Maryland-based Sinclair Broadcast Group for $370 million. The acquisition of the Barrington stations received FCC approval on November 18, 2013, and was formally consummated six days later on November 25. Sinclair transferred ownership of KVII/KVIH and the other former Barrington stations to Chesapeake Television, a subsidiary (which set up its headquarters at Barrington's former Schaumburg offices) focusing on smaller markets that maintains separate management than that which runs Sinclair's large and mid-market outlets. As result of the Barrington purchase, KVII gained new sister stations in nearby markets: Fox affiliate KOKH-TV and CW affiliate KOCB in Oklahoma City, and Fox affiliate KSAS-TV and its MyNetworkTV-affiliated LMA partner KMTW in Wichita.

Subchannel history

KVII-DT2
KVII-DT2 (branded as "CW 11 Amarillo") is the CW-affiliated second digital subchannel of KVII-TV, broadcasting in 16:9 widescreen standard definition on channel 7.2 (or channel 12.2 within the KVIH-TV coverage area). All programming on KVII-DT2/KVIH-DT2 is received through The CW's programming feed for smaller media markets, The CW Plus, which provides a set schedule of syndicated programming acquired by The CW during time periods without network programs; however, Sinclair handles local advertising and promotional services for the subchannel.

KVII-DT2's history traces back to the September 21, 1998, launch of a cable-only affiliate of The WB that was managed, promoted and had its advertising sales handled by KVII (originally through then-parent Marsh Media and later under New Vision Television II and Barrington Broadcasting), alongside the launch of The WB 100+ Station Group, a national service that was created to expand coverage of The WB via primarily local origination channels managed by cable providers to smaller areas with a Nielsen Media Research market ranking above #100. The channel – which was branded on-air as "KDBA," an unofficial callsign assigned by Marsh as it was a cable-exclusive outlet not licensed by the Federal Communications Commission – was carried locally on TCA Cable TV (which sold its Texas Panhandle systems in May 1999 to Cox Communications, which in turn sold its systems in the area to Cebridge Connections [now Suddenlink Communications] in May 2006) and on select other cable providers throughout the Amarillo market. Before the launch of "KDBA", viewers in the Amarillo market received WB network programming via the superstation feed of Chicago affiliate WGN-TV beginning at the network's January 1995 launch.

On January 24, 2006, the respective parent companies of UPN and The WB, CBS Corporation and the Warner Bros. Entertainment division of Time Warner, announced that they would dissolve the two networks to create The CW Television Network, a joint venture between the two media companies that initially featured programs from its two predecessor networks as well as new series specifically produced for The CW. Subsequently, on February 22, 2006, News Corporation announced the launch of MyNetworkTV, a network operated by Fox Television Stations and its syndication division Twentieth Television that was created to primarily to provide network programming to UPN and WB stations that The CW decided against affiliating based on their local viewership standing in comparison to the outlet that The CW ultimately chose as its charter outlets, giving these stations another option besides converting to a general entertainment independent format.

On April 10, in a joint announcement by the network and Barrington Broadcasting, KVII-TV was confirmed as The CW's charter affiliate for the Amarillo market; Barrington subsequently assumed the operations of "KDBA," which was expected to take over the CW affiliation, and converted the channel to an over-the-air digital feed on KVII-DT 7.2 and KVIH-DT 12.2 to provide The CW's programming to Amarillo area viewers who do not subscribe to cable television; KVII-DT2 became an affiliate of the network's small-market feed, The CW Plus, when the network debuted on September 18, 2006. In early 2015, KVII upgraded the "CW 11 Amarillo" subchannel to 720p high definition, providing over-the-air access to HD content from The CW in the Amarillo market for the first time; the prime time newscast was not upgraded to HD until January 2016.

KVII-DT3
KVII-DT3 is the Comet-owned-and-operated third digital subchannel of KVII-TV, broadcasting in widescreen standard definition on channel 7.3 (or channel 12.3 within the KVIH-TV coverage area).

KVII/KVIH launched a digital subchannel on virtual channels 7.3 and 12.3 on April 1, 2006, to serve as an affiliate of The Tube Music Network, through a groupwide agreement encompassing many of Barrington's network-affiliated stations. The Tube ceased operations on October 1, 2007, citing "financial limitations" as well as due to disagreements between network parent The Tube Media Corp. and certain station group partners over compliance of newly enacted FCC requirements for digital subchannels. The subchannel subsequently became an affiliate of The Local AccuWeather Channel, under the brand "StormSearch 7 Weather Channel". (It was one of two weather-focused subchannel services available in the Amarillo market, alongside KAMR-TV's NBC Weather Plus subchannel on its DT2 feed, which was later replaced by a simulcast of MyNetworkTV-affiliated sister KCPN-LP [channel 33] after the former network ceased operations in December 2008). Alongside carrying regional and national forecast segments provided by the AccuWeather-operated network, KVII also produced pre-recorded local forecast segments presented by meteorologists from the "StormSearch 7" weather team – which were updated two to three times per day – for the subchannel as well as a half-hour block of syndicated educational children's programs on Monday through Saturday afternoons to comply with FCC Children's Television Act programming guidelines.

After being silent for a year after it disaffiliated from AccuWeather in September 2013, KVII relaunched its DT3 subchannel on December 31, 2014 as an affiliate of Grit, through a multi-station affiliation agreement between Sinclair and Grit parent Katz Broadcasting. On October 31, 2015, KVII-DT3 disaffiliated from Grit to become a charter affiliate of Comet, a science fiction-focused network owned as a joint venture between Sinclair and MGM Television. (Grit returned to the market via second digital subchannel of Fox affiliate KCIT [channel 14] on August 25, 2016, in which KCIT's DT2 feed disaffiliated from This TV).

KVII-DT4
KVII-DT4 is the TBD-owned-and-operated fourth digital subchannel of KVII-TV, broadcasting in widescreen standard definition on channel 7.4 (or channel 12.4 within the KVIH-TV coverage area). On November 1, 2017, KVII/KVIH launched a digital subchannel on virtual channel 7.4 and 12.4, serving as an affiliate of the sports network Stadium (owned as a joint venture between Sinclair and Silver Chalice), the affiliation lasted until 2020 when KVII/KVIH replaced it with sister network TBD.

Programming
KVII-TV currently broadcasts the full ABC network schedule, with the only programming preemptions being the ABC News Brief seen during ABC Daytime programming, and situations in which preemption of the network's daytime and prime time programs is necessary to allow the main channel to provide extended coverage of breaking news or severe weather events (in some instances, these programs may either be rebroadcast on KVII on tape delay in place of the station's regular overnight programming, however, cable and satellite subscribers have the option of watching the affected shows on ABC's desktop and mobile streaming platforms or its cable/satellite video-on-demand service the day after their initial airing). The station carries the network's Sunday morning political/news discussion program This Week live via its Eastern Time Zone feed (at 8:00 a.m.), due to its broadcast of the Sinclair-produced investigative news program Full Measure and locally based Quail Creek Church's weekly televised services. KVII is one of a few ABC affiliates to air paid programming on weekdays.

Excluding those carried on KVII-DT2 via The CW Plus, syndicated programs broadcast by KVII-TV include Live with Kelly and Ryan (which has aired on KVII since the late 1980s under previous hosts Regis Philbin and Kathie Lee Gifford), Judge Judy, The Drew Barrymore Show, U.S. Farm Report, and Wheel of Fortune (Amarillo is one of a small number of U.S. television markets in which Wheel of Fortune and Jeopardy! are carried on separate stations: Jeopardy! airs on CBS affiliate KFDA-TV, which has carried the program locally since September 2001). KVII also serves as the Amarillo market carrier of the statewide-syndicated feature program Texas Country Reporter.

Starting with the 2002–03 season and ending in its final season (2010–11), KVII broadcast The Oprah Winfrey Show to viewers in the Texas Panhandle; prior to that time, NBC affiliate KAMR had aired the show for several years from its 1986–87 start when the station replaced it with The Wayne Brady Show (and later The Ellen DeGeneres Show).

News operation

, KVII-TV presently broadcasts 22 hours of locally produced newscasts each week (with 4½ hours on weekdays and one hour each on Saturdays and Sundays). In addition, KVII produces five hours of locally produced newscasts each week for its CW-affiliated subchannel KVII-DT2 (running for a half-hour each on weekdays only). The station may also simulcast long-form severe weather coverage on KVII-DT2 in the event that a tornado warning is issued for any county within the Texas and Oklahoma Panhandles as well as Eastern New Mexico.

The ProNews title had been used at KVII-TV continuously since Marsh Media purchased the station from John Walton in late 1967. For many years, the 10:00 p.m. edition of ProNews was a 45-minute broadcast, but has been truncated back to 35 minutes in recent years. Also, ProNews 7 broadcast a noon newscast on Sundays during the 1970s and 1980s, along with the noon broadcast Monday through Friday.

On February 6, 2012, KVII began producing a half-hour prime time newscast at 9:00 p.m. for KVII-DT2, which aired only on Monday through Friday nights, under the title ProNews 7 at 9:00 (now ABC 7 News: The Panhandle's News at 9:00). The KVII-produced program would gain additional prime-time news competitors beginning with the launch of a half-hour prime time newscast in that timeslot on KCIT (channel 14), a program that NBC-affiliated sister station KAMR-TV began producing for the Fox affiliate in March 2001 after the station brought back a newscast for channel 14 after a 6-year absence.

On April 6, 2015, KVII unveiled a new studio, and discontinued the previous Pro News 7 brand in favor of simply ABC 7 News.

Notable former on-air staff
Kathy Vara, now at KNBC in Los Angeles

Technical information

Subchannels
The stations' digital signals are multiplexed:

Analog-to-digital conversion
By mid-October 2006, the digital signal was fully operating, coinciding with the introduction of a viewer-interactive newscast, in which viewers can send e-mails with questions and concerns in regards to the stories and features in the newscasts. KVII-TV shut down its analog signal, over VHF channel 7, on June 12, 2009, the official date in which full-power television stations in the United States transitioned from analog to digital television under federal mandate. The station's digital signal relocated from its pre-transition UHF channel 23 to its pre-transition analog allocation of VHF channel 7.

Repeater stations
To reach viewers throughout the 34 counties comprising the Amarillo television market, KVII-TV extends its over-the-air coverage area through a full-power satellite station and a network of 12 low-power translator stations encompassing much of the Texas and Oklahoma Panhandles, and the northeastern New Mexico that distribute its programming beyond the  range of its broadcast signal. (All low-power translators transmit on virtual channel 7, including those located adjacent to KVIH-TV's coverage area.) Nielsen Media Research treats KVII and KVIH as one station in local ratings books, using the identifier name "KVII+".

KVII and KVIH serve viewers across a four-state region including the Texas and Oklahoma panhandles, eastern New Mexico and southwestern Kansas. A unique feature of KVII's coverage area is that it covers two time zones — Central and Mountain. This means that viewers in New Mexico watch ABC's prime time schedule from 6:00 to 9:00 p.m. (instead of 7:00 to 10:00 p.m.), with Jimmy Kimmel Live! airing at 9:35 p.m.

Full-power satellite stations

Current

Former

Translator stations

See also 

 Channel 20 digital TV stations in the United States
 Channel 7 virtual TV stations in the United States

Notes

References

External links 
 

ABC network affiliates
The CW affiliates
Comet (TV network) affiliates
TBD (TV network) affiliates
Charge! (TV network) affiliates
Sinclair Broadcast Group
Television channels and stations established in 1957
VII-TV
1957 establishments in Texas